Odontoglossum cirrhosum, the wavy odontoglossum, is a species of orchid found from Colombia to Ecuador.

cirrhosum